There are at least 37 named glaciers in Wyoming.Wyoming'''  is a state in the mountain region of the Western United States.  Wyoming is the 10th most extensive, but the least populous and the 2nd least densely populated of the 50 United States.  The western two thirds of the state is covered mostly with the mountain ranges and rangelands in the foothills of the Eastern Rocky Mountains, while the eastern third of the state is high elevation prairie known as the High Plains.

 Baby Glacier,  Sublette County, Wyoming, el. 
 Bull Lake Glacier,  Fremont County, Wyoming, el. 
 Connie Glacier,  Sublette County, Wyoming, el. 
 Continental Glacier,  Fremont County, Wyoming, el. 
 Dinwoody Glacier,  Fremont County, Wyoming, el. 
 Downs Glacier,  Fremont County, Wyoming, el. 
 Dry Creek Glacier, Fremont County, Wyoming, el. 
 DuNoir Glacier,  Fremont County, Wyoming, el. 
 East Torrey Glacier, Fremont County, Wyoming, el. 
 Falling Ice Glacier,  Teton County, Wyoming, el. 
 Fishhawk Glacier,  Park County, Wyoming, el. 
 Gannett Glacier,  Fremont County, Wyoming, el. 
 Gooseneck Glacier,  Fremont County, Wyoming, el. 
 Grasshopper Glacier,  Fremont County, Wyoming, el. 
 Harrower Glacier,  Sublette County, Wyoming, el. 
 Heap Steep Glacier,  Fremont County, Wyoming, el. 
 Helen Glacier,  Fremont County, Wyoming, el. 
 Hooker Glacier,  Fremont County, Wyoming, el. 
 J Glacier,  Sublette County, Wyoming, el. 
 Klondike Glacier, Fremont County, Wyoming, el. 
 Knife Point Glacier,  Fremont County, Wyoming, el. 
 Lander Glacier, Fremont County, Wyoming, el. 
 Lizard Head Glacier, Fremont County, Wyoming, el. 
 Lower Fremont Glacier,  Fremont County, Wyoming, el. 
 Mammoth Glacier,  Sublette County, Wyoming, el. 
 Middle Teton Glacier,  Teton County, Wyoming, el. 
 Minor Glacier,  Sublette County, Wyoming, el. 
 Petersen Glacier,  Teton County, Wyoming, el. 
 Sacagawea Glacier,  Fremont County, Wyoming, el. 
 Schoolroom Glacier,  Teton County, Wyoming, el. 
 Skillet Glacier,  Teton County, Wyoming, el. 
 Sourdough Glacier,  Sublette County, Wyoming, el. 
 Sphinx Glacier,  Sublette County, Wyoming, el. 
 Stroud Glacier,  Sublette County, Wyoming, el. 
 Teepe Glacier,  Teton County, Wyoming, el. 
 Teton Glacier,  Teton County, Wyoming, el. 
 Tiny Glacier,  Sublette County, Wyoming, el. 
 Triple Glaciers,  Teton County, Wyoming, el. 
 Twins Glacier,  Sublette County, Wyoming, el. 
 Upper Fremont Glacier,  Fremont County, Wyoming, el. 
 Washakie Glacier,  Fremont County, Wyoming, el. 
 Wind River Glacier,  Fremont County, Wyoming, el.

See also
 List of glaciers in the United States
 List of mountain ranges in Wyoming

Notes

 
Wyoming
Glaciers, Wyoming